Earl of Wessex is a title that has been created twice in British history – once in the pre-Conquest Anglo-Saxon nobility of England, and once in the Peerage of the United Kingdom. In the 6th century AD the region of Wessex (the lands of the West Saxons), in the south and southwest of present-day England, became one of the Anglo-Saxon kingdoms (one of the components of the so-called Heptarchy); in the tenth century the increasing power of the Kingdom of the West Saxons led to a united Kingdom of England.

First creation (c. 1019) 
Wessex was one of the four earldoms of Anglo-Danish England. In this period, the earldom of Wessex covered the lands of the old kingdom of Wessex, covering the counties of the south of England, and extending west to the Welsh border.

During the reign of King Cnut, the earldom was conferred on Godwin at some time after 1020. Thereafter, Godwin rose to become, in King Edward's time, the most powerful man in the kingdom. Upon Godwin's death in 1053, the earldom passed to his son, who later became King Harold II and died at the Battle of Hastings in 1066.

| Godwin, Earl of WessexHouse of Godwinalso: Earl of Kent (1020)</small>
| 
| Born probably inSussex, Godwin's father was probably Wulfnoth Cild, who was a thegn of Sussex
| Gytha Thorkelsdóttirc. 99711 children
| 15 April 1053Winchester, Hampshire, EnglandAge unknown
|-
| Harold GodwinsonHouse of Godwin<small>also: Earl of East Anglia (1052);King of England (1066)
| 
| Son of Godwin of Wessexand Gytha Thorkelsdóttir
|  Edith Swannesha5 children Ealdgyth2 sons
| 14 October 1066HastingsDied in the Battle of Hastings aged about 44
|-
| colspan=5|Upon Godwin's death, the earldom passed to his son, who later became King Harold II and died at the Battle of Hastings in 1066; the title became extinct on his death.
|-
|}

Second creation (1999)
The current Earl of Wessex is also Duke of Edinburgh, Earl of Forfar, and Viscount Severn. This Earl of Wessex title is currently used as a courtesy title by the Duke's son and heir-apparent to the earldoms of Wessex and Forfar, James Mountbatten-Windsor.

In 1999, Queen Elizabeth II's youngest son, Prince Edward, married Sophie Rhys-Jones. Younger sons of the monarch have customarily been given dukedoms at the time of their marriage, and experts had suggested the former royal dukedoms of Cambridge and Sussex as the most likely to be granted to Prince Edward. Instead, the Palace announced that Prince Edward would eventually be given the title Duke of Edinburgh, which was at the time held by his father. This did not happen by direct inheritance, as Prince Edward is the youngest of Prince Philip's three sons.  The title of Duke of Edinburgh was newly created for Prince Edward on 10 March 2023, after it reverted to the Crown following "both the death of the first Duke of Edinburgh, and the second Duke Charles III's succession as King."On his creation as Duke of Edinburgh on 10 March 2023, Edward's son James became styled with the courtesy title of Earl of Wessex as that is now his father's most senior subsidiary title.

At the occasion of his marriage, in keeping with the tradition of a monarch's son receiving a title upon marriage, but preserving the rank of duke for the future, Prince Edward became the first British prince in centuries to be specifically created an earl, rather than a duke. His wife Sophie became The Countess of Wessex. The Sunday Telegraph newspaper reported that he was drawn to the historic title of Earl of Wessex after watching the 1998 film Shakespeare in Love, in which a character with the title 'Lord Wessex' is played by Colin Firth.

| Prince EdwardHouse of Windsor1999–presentalso: Duke of Edinburgh (2023), Earl of Forfar (2019), Viscount Severn (1999)
| 
| 10 March 1964Buckingham Palace, Londonson of Queen Elizabeth II and Prince Philip
| 19 June 1999Sophie Rhys-Jones2 children
| Alive (now  old)
|-
|}

Line of succession

  Prince Edward, Duke of Edinburgh (b. 1964)
 (1)  James, Earl of Wessex (b. 2007)

Notes

References

British monarchy
Earldoms in England before 1066
Earldoms in the Peerage of the United Kingdom
 
Noble titles created in 1999
1999 establishments in the United Kingdom
Prince Edward, Earl of Wessex